The University of Oregon School of Law is a public law school in the U.S. state of Oregon. Housed in the Knight Law Center, it is Oregon's only state funded law school. The school, founded in 1884, is located on the University of Oregon campus in Eugene, on the corner of 15th and Agate streets, overlooking  Hayward Field.

History

Oregon Law was founded in 1884 in Portland, Oregon. Richard R. Thornton organized the department that began as a two-year program with three classes per week. In 1906, the course of study was expanded to three years, and in April 1915, the school's board of regents ordered that the program be moved to Eugene as part of a consolidation program within the university. Though the school moved, some of the faculty remained in Portland and started the Northwest College of Law, now the Lewis & Clark Law School. In 1923, the school was approved by the American Bar Association (ABA), one of the first 39 schools to earn that distinction in the initial year of the ABA approval of law schools.

In 1931, Wayne Morse became dean. Three years later, the law school organized a chapter of the national law school honor society, the Order of the Coif. In 1938, the law school moved to Fenton Hall. In 1939, the law school graduated Minoru Yasui, who later took his challenge to the military curfew on Japanese Americans during World War II all the way to the United States Supreme Court.

In 1941, Orlando John Hollis became acting dean. His appointment became permanent in 1945 when Morse resigned to run for the U.S. Senate. During the war years, many law students were called to service. In 1944, there were no graduating students; in 1945, only one student graduated. After the war's conclusion, the school admitted every returning veteran who sought a legal education: out of 26 students who graduated in 1948, 25 had served in World War II.

The post-war era was marked by the Oregon legislature's adoption of law professor Kenneth O'Connell's Oregon Revised Statutes. Professor O'Connell was appointed to the Oregon Supreme Court in 1958, and later became its chief justice.

During the 1960s, Professor (and later dean) Chapin Clark offered the school's first courses in environmental and natural resources law. Later that decade, Professor Jon Jacobson founded the school's Ocean and Coastal Law Center. In 1968, Eugene Scoles became dean.

In 1970, the law school moved into a new building, the Law Center. In 1974, the Wayne Morse Chair of Law and Politics was established as a "living memorial" to former dean and U.S. Senator Wayne Morse. In 1977, Professor Hans A. Linde was appointed to the Oregon Supreme Court. In 1978, the school established the first-in-the-world Environmental Law Clinic.

During the 1980s, the Environmental Law Clinic doubled in size and was renamed the Pacific Northwest Natural Resources Clinic. In 1981, Professor Dave Frohnmayer became Oregon Attorney General. In 1982, students organized the first Public Interest Environmental Law Conference. In 1986, the Journal of Environmental Law and Litigation began publication.

In the new century, the school opened the Appropriate Dispute Resolution Program. In 2003, the Environmental and Natural Resources Law Program opened a fully staffed office. In 2004, the Center for Law and Entrepreneurship opened a Small Business Clinic to assist small and micro-businesses. The school also has started a program in Portland, which moved into Portland's White Stag Building in 2008. The Portland Program focuses on business law and related externships.

Rankings

For the 2020-21 academic year, the law school is ranked 72nd in the country by U.S. News & World Reports 2022 edition of "America's Best Graduate Schools."

The University of Oregon is known for possessing the nation's first public law school to establish an environmental law program (ENR). The ENR Program is ranked 10th in the country by U.S. News & World Report for the 2020-21 academic year. The program includes a master's of law degree (LL.M.) option.

Programs

The law school also houses a prominent Appropriate Dispute Resolution Center, which provides courses both to law students and to graduate students interested in Conflict and Dispute Resolution. The ADR program is ranked 12th in the country by U.S. News & World Report for the 2020–21 academic year.

The law school's Legal Research and Writing (LRW) Program also is well regarded. For the 2020–21 academic year, U.S. News & World Report ranked the LRW Program number 1 in the nation.

Law publications 
The School of Law is home to several legal journals.

 The Journal of Environmental Law and Litigation is a student-run law journal founded in 1986 and dedicated to the examination of environmental and natural resources law.
 The Oregon Law Review is the flagship law review of the University of Oregon School of Law.  It was founded in 1921 and originally run by the school faculty.  From 19251938 the Law Review served as the journal for the Oregon Bar Association. By 1967, the Law Review had been turned over to a student board of editors. Published on a biannual basis, it is the oldest continually published law journal in the Pacific Northwest. 
 The Oregon Review of International Law is a student-run journal founded in 1999 and published continually since.  It specializes in topics pertaining to international law and policy.

Employment 
More than 91% of Oregon Law’s 2021 class is employed as of 10 months after graduation.

Costs
The total cost of attendance (indicating the cost of tuition, fees, and living expenses) at Oregon for the 2018–2019 academic year was $60,342 for non-residents and $50,814 for Oregon residents. The Law School Transparency estimated debt-financed cost of attendance for three years is $199,048 for non-residents and $170,167 for Oregon residents.

Public Interest Environmental Law Conference
The Public Interest Environmental Law Conference (PIELC) is a conference held annually on the first weekend in March at the University of Oregon School of Law in Eugene, Oregon, United States.  The conference is a gathering of environmental activists, advocates, and students from across the United States and the world.

PIELC is organized and hosted by the students involved in the environmental law society "Land Air Water" (LAW). Land Air Water is a student group at the University of Oregon School of Law. It is co-sponsored by Friends of Land Air Water, a University of Oregon/Land Air Water alumni group that helps advise the student organizers.

The conference has six to ten internationally recognized keynote addresses and over 120 panels. The conference has been held since 1983 and celebrated its 30th anniversary in 2012.

The conference is held on the first weekend in March. Early panels start Thursday afternoon, and the official opening is Thursday evening. It closes with a final address Sunday at noon. Typically the conference has around 2,000 attendees.

The content of the conference is aimed at professional environmental activists, such as people that work in non-profit public interest organizations such as the Wilderness Society, the Sierra Club, and the Oregon Natural Desert Association and public interest environmental attorneys like Earthjustice, Natural Resources Defense Council, and private public interest attorneys. CLE credits are available.

The conference is also of interest to students of environmental law and environmental studies, and each year it hosts groups from around a dozen different schools.

The conference is unapologetically pro-public interest, and pro-environment. It does not attempt to persuade the general public that environmental issues matter. It is a forum for the people who are actively enforcing environmental law, and promoting environmental values to talk among themselves, and share experiences, strategies, and news.

Notable alumni

Ann Aiken (1979) – Chief Judge, United States District Court for the District of Oregon 
Robert C. Belloni (1951) – former Judge, United States District Court for the District of Oregon 
Suzanne Bonamici (1983) – member, United States House of Representatives 
David V. Brewer (1977) – Associate Justice of the Oregon Supreme Court
William G. East (1932) – former Judge, United States District Court for the District of Oregon 
William A. Ekwall (1912) – former member, United States House of Representatives; former Judge, United States Customs Court 
Edward N. Fadeley (1957) – former Justice, Oregon Supreme Court; former President, Oregon State Senate
Jack Faust (1958) – Portland First Citizen, former TV broadcaster
John Frohnmayer (1972) – former Chairman of the National Endowment for the Arts
Helen J. Frye (1966) – former Judge, United States District Court for the District of Oregon 
Alfred Goodwin (1951) – Senior Judge, Ninth Circuit Court of Appeals 
Bert E. Haney (1903) – former Judge, Ninth Circuit Court of Appeals 
Arthur D. Hay (1911) – former Justice, Oregon Supreme Court 
Donald Hodel (1960) – former Secretary of Energy and Secretary of the Interior; former President, Christian Coalition; former President and CEO, Focus on the Family 
Earl C. Latourette (1912) – former Chief Justice, Oregon Supreme Court
Malcolm F. Marsh (1954) – Senior Judge, United States District Court for the District of Oregon 
Yōsuke Matsuoka (1900) –  Foreign Minister of Japan
Julius L. Meier (1895) – former Governor of Oregon 
Hardy Myers (1964) – former Oregon Attorney General 
Edwin J. Peterson (1957) – former Chief Justice, Oregon Supreme Court
Raymond F. Rees, (1976) United States Army Major General, acting Chief of the National Guard Bureau, Adjutant General of Oregon
R. William Riggs (1968) – former Justice, Oregon Supreme Court
Ellen Rosenblum (1975) – Oregon Attorney General; former Judge, Oregon Court of Appeals.
David Schuman (1984) – former Judge, Oregon Court of Appeals; former associate dean and professor at the University of Oregon School of Law 
Frederick Steiwer (1908) – former United States Senator from Oregon 
Jacob Tanzer (1959) – former Justice, Oregon Supreme Court 
Thomas Tongue (1937) – former Justice, Oregon Supreme Court
Richard Unis (1953) – former Justice, Oregon Supreme Court
Martha Lee Walters (1977) – Justice, Oregon Supreme Court 
Harold Warner (1916) – former Chief Justice, Oregon Supreme Court
Wendell Wyatt (1941) – former member, United States House of Representatives 
Ron Wyden (1974) – United States Senator from Oregon 
Minoru Yasui (1939) – namesake for ''Yasui v. United States'
Fred Risser (1952) – Wisconsin State Senator and longest serving state legislator in America History.

References

External links
Law School in Portland

Environmental law schools
Oregon
Law
1884 establishments in Oregon
Natural resources law
Law schools in Oregon